Milton Cemetery is a historic cemetery at 211 Centre Street in Milton, Massachusetts. Established in 1672, it is the town's only municipal burying ground.

It was founded in 1672 and added to the National Register of Historic Places in 2004. Among those interred in the cemetery are:
 Dennis Miller Bunker, American Impressionist Painter 
 James A. Burke, United States Representative from Massachusetts
 Elbie Fletcher, Major League Baseball player
 Edward A. Gisburne, United States Navy sailor and Medal of Honor recipient
 Nathaniel Carl Goodwin, actor and vaudevillian
 Howard Deering Johnson, businessman and founder of the Howard Johnson's restaurant and hotel chain
 Wendell Phillips, abolitionist, advocate for Native Americans, and orator 
 Steve Trapilo, player in the National Football League
 Paul H. Weinert, United States Army soldier and Medal of Honor recipient

See also
 National Register of Historic Places listings in Milton, Massachusetts

References

External links

 
 Visit Milton Cemetery

Milton, Massachusetts
Cemeteries on the National Register of Historic Places in Massachusetts
Queen Anne architecture in Massachusetts
Gothic Revival architecture in Massachusetts
Cemeteries in Norfolk County, Massachusetts
National Register of Historic Places in Milton, Massachusetts
Rural cemeteries
Cemeteries established in the 17th century